Roland McGhee (born October 15, 1971) is an American former long jumper. His personal record mark of  ranks him in the all-time top 25 for the event, as of 2016. He was twice a national champion, winning outdoors and indoors in 1998. He represented his country at the 1995 World Championships in Athletics and 1999 IAAF World Indoor Championships. Also a sprinter, he was a bronze medallist in the relay at the 1994 IAAF World Cup.

Career
Born in Flint, Michigan, he competed sporadically in track and field events at a young age before settling on long jump. Growing up in Ohio, he attended Trotwood-Madison High School, but did not win any state high school titles. He began higher studies at Middle Tennessee State University and competed athletically for their Blue Raiders team.

While at Middle Tennessee he was the long jump runner-up at National Collegiate Athletic Association (NCAA) level on three occasions, coming second at the 1993 NCAA Indoor Championships and the 1992 and 1994 NCAA Outdoors (to Erick Walder each time). He earned nine NCAA All-America honours during the period from 1990 to 1994. He also won four straight Ohio Valley Conference regional titles in the long jump and 100-meter dash, as well as three triple jump and two 200-meter dash titles. He was later inducted into the Blue Raiders hall of fame.

His career highest placings were fourth in the 1995 and 1998 seasons.

McGhee made his international debut for the United States at the 1994 IAAF World Cup. Teaming up with Mark Witherspoon, Marcel Carter, and Sam Jefferson he took third in the 4 × 100-meter relay behind the BRitish and African teams. This proved to be the only international podium finish of his career. He qualified for the 1995 World Championships in Athletics long jump after Carl Lewis withdrew, but failed to record a valid mark there after suffering a groin strain. He failed to get near eight metres at either the 1998 IAAF World Cup or the 1999 IAAF World Indoor Championships and was not close to a medal.

At national level, he reached his first final in 1995 and finished in fourth place with a wind-assisted . He was sporadic in major competitions, frequently adjusting his run up approach and often did not perform well. He did not record a valid mark at the 1996 United States Olympic Trials and was tenth at the 1997 USA Outdoor Track and Field Championships. He secured national titles at the USA Outdoor Track and Field Championships and USA Indoor Track and Field Championships in 1998. This was the last time he broke eight meters at the competition, however, as he was fourth at the national championships in 1999 and 2002 and seventh at the 2000 United States Olympic Trials.

McGhee was a regular feature on the international professional track circuit in the late 1990s. He was a finalist at the IAAF Grand Prix Final in 1995, 1997 and 1999. His career best came in lower-level competition: at the Grande Premio Brasil Caixa de Atletismo he jumped  to lift himself into the all-time top twenty athletes for the long jump. This remains the meeting record.

Personal records
Long jump – 8.51 m (1995)
Long jump indoors – 8.28 m (1995)
55-meter dash – 6.45 sec (2001)
60-meter dash – 6.75 sec (1998)
100-meter dash – 10.41 sec (1994)
200-meter dash – 20.4 sec (1994)
4 × 100-meter relay – 39.33 sec (1994)

All information from All Athletics

International competitions

National titles
USA Outdoor Track and Field Championships
Long jump: 1998
USA Indoor Track and Field Championships
Long jump: 1998

References

External links

Living people
1971 births
Sportspeople from Flint, Michigan
American male long jumpers
American male sprinters
African-American male track and field athletes
World Athletics Championships athletes for the United States
Middle Tennessee Blue Raiders men's track and field athletes
21st-century African-American sportspeople
20th-century African-American sportspeople